Henry Hanshard (also Hansard) (d. 1446) was a Canon of Windsor from 1444 to 1446

Career

He was appointed:
Rector of St Margaret, New Fish Street 1428 - 1436
Rector of St Mary Somerset, London until 1415
Rector of Clifton Keynes

He was appointed to the third stall in St George's Chapel, Windsor Castle in 1444 and held the canonry until 1446.

Notes 

1446 deaths
Canons of Windsor
Year of birth unknown